The PP-90M1 (Cyrillic: ПП-90М1) is a 9×19mm Parabellum Russian submachine gun developed by KBP Instrument Design Bureau in the 1990s. It features a 64-round helical magazine, and other than sharing a manufacturer is unrelated to the similarly named PP-90M.

The weapon may also be used with a 32-round box magazine if desired.

Users 
 : Used by Spetsnaz.
 : Used by police forces.

See also
 PP-90
 PP-19 Bizon, another Russian SMG that is similar in appearance to the PP-90M1
 List of Russian weaponry

Sources

References

9mm Parabellum submachine guns
Submachine guns of Russia
KBP Instrument Design Bureau products